Gee-Gees Field is a multi-purpose stadium at the University of Ottawa in Ottawa, Ontario, Canada. It is home to the Ottawa Gee-Gees in multiple sports. It was opened in 2013, to serve as the first on-campus home to the Gee-Gees football team in 120 years.

Along with the stadium came all new facilities for the team at the Lees section of campus. This included new team rooms, coaches’ offices, dedicated athletic therapy and video rooms. The field is also fitted with a dome for use during the winter months, which provides opportunities to be utilized by the schools varsity teams, intramural sports, and other public clubs or community organizations.

In October 2013, Gee-Gees Field hosted the iconic Panda Game. In November 2018, the site was the host venue for the U Sports Women's Soccer National Championship.

References
 

University of Ottawa
Ottawa Gee-Gees
Canadian football venues in Ontario
2013 establishments in Ontario